Elections to the Nagaland Legislative Assembly were held in February 1974 to elect members of the 60 constituencies in Nagaland, India. United Democratic Front won the most number of seats and Vizol Angami was appointed as the Chief Minister of Nagaland.

After the previous election in 1969, the number of constituencies in Nagaland were increased from 40 to 60, following the recommendation of the Delimitation Commission of India.

Results

Elected Members

See also
List of constituencies of the Nagaland Legislative Assembly
1974 elections in India

References

Nagaland
State Assembly elections in Nagaland
1974